The Huizhou–Dayawan railway or Huida railway is a single-track freight-only railway line located in Huizhou, Guangdong, China.

History

Work to extend the railway to the Huizhou Port had already started in December 2003. The one-station extension to  opened on December 2009.

The station at the Quanwan coal terminal is named .

Stations
 (惠州西)
 (惠环西)
 (惠阳)
 (大亚湾)
 (惠州港)
 (纯洲)

Route
The line leaves the Beijing–Kowloon railway west of Huizhou West railway station in Huicheng District and heads south, through Huiyang District, to Dayawan railway station. The line then splits into multiple branches which terminate at the coast.

Future Development
There are proposals to electrify the railway, add a second track, and operate passenger services.

References

Railway lines in China
Railway lines opened in 2004